Nirav Shah (born 16 November 1974) is an Indian cinematographer. He has worked on  a number of major box office hits in Tamil, Hindi and Malayalam since his debut with the 2004 Hindi film Paisa Vasool.

Career
After having worked as an assistant to other noted cinematographers and solely on many television advertisements, music videos and short films, Nirav Shah became an independent cinematographer for a "full feature film", debuting with the 2004 Bollywood film Paisa Vasool, following which he worked on another Hindi project Intequam (2004). It was, however, the Hindi blockbuster film Dhoom (2004) that made people take notice of Shah, winning him accolades and gaining him fame and popularity.

Subsequently, Shah got offers from the Tamil film industry as well and moved southwards, debuting in Kollywood with the 2005 Linguswamy-directed action film Sandakozhi, following which he was called up by director Vishnuvardhan. They first teamed up for the 2005 Tamil gangster film Pattiyal, following which Vishnuvardhan worked together with Shah for all his following feature films, creating, along with noted music composer, Yuvan Shankar Raja, one of the most acclaimed and most successful collaborations in the Tamil film industry. Shah's works in Vishnuvardhan's films including Arinthum Ariyamalum (2005), Billa (2007) and the most recent Sarvam (2008) got high praise and much critical acclaim, turning him into one of the most sought-after young cinematographers in Kollywood.

He returned to Bollywood to work on the films Banaras  and the sequel of Dhoom (both 2006), for which Shah again won accolades and also received several awards and nominations, particular for the latter one. He was signed up by Prabhu Deva for the Vijay-starrer Pokkiri (2007) and by the director-duo Pushkar-Gayathri for their debut venture Oram Po (2007). In 2008 then, Nirav Shah was called by noted filmmaker Shankar to handle the camera for his forthcoming magnum opus science-fiction film Enthiran, but Shah had to reject the invitation because he had already given his word to his friend Vishnuvardhan's Sarvam. He went on to work on the Hindi remake of Pokkiri, Wanted, directed again by Prabhu Deva and A. L. Vijay's Madrasapattinam.

In July 2009, it was announced that Shah would soon turn film director, directing a film under actor Arya's production, starring Arya's brother Sathya in the lead role. Besides, Shah is currently developing and building India's biggest film studio, located at the Old Mahabalipuram Road off Chennai, Tamil Nadu, India, which is said to cost around Rs. 100 crore.

Three of his films have been nominated at the National Award for the Best Cinematographer: Banaras (Hindi), Pattiyal (Tamil) and Dhoom 2 (Hindi). He won the Tamil Nadu Government's State Award for Best Cinematographer for Billa (Tamil).

Filmography

Accolades

Winner 
Bollywood Movie Best Cinematography Award – Dhoom 2 (shared with Vikas Sivaraman) (2007)
Tamil Nadu State Film Award for Best Cinematographer – Billa (2007) 
Cinema Rasigargal Sangam Best Cinematographer Award – Billa (2007)  
Isaiyaruvi Sunfeast Tamil Music Award for Best Cinematography – Billa (2007) 
Tamil Nadu State Film Award for Best Cinematographer – Kaaviya Thalaivan (2014) 
Ananda Vikatan Cinema Awards– Best Cinematography - Super Deluxe

Nomination 
Star Screen Award for Best Cinematography – Dhoom (2004) 
Vijay Awards
 2011 – Madrasapattinam – Best Cinematography
 2012 – Deiva Thirumagal – Best Cinematography

South Indian International Movie Awards
 2019- 2.0 – Best Cinematography

References

External links

 

1974 births
Living people
Artists from Mumbai
Tamil film cinematographers
Telugu film cinematographers
21st-century Indian photographers
Cinematographers from Tamil Nadu